The 2008 United States rugby union tour of Japan was a series of matches played in November 2008 in Japan by United States national rugby union team.

Results

United States
tour
United States national rugby union team tours
tour
Rugby union tours of Japan